Stadium / Federal Hill station (formerly Hamburg Street station) is a Baltimore Light Rail station in Baltimore, Maryland, located adjacent to M&T Bank Stadium. Although built to serve the stadium, it also provides access to the nearby Federal Hill and Pigtown neighborhoods.

History

The station was not part of the initial operating segment, which opened in 1992. At that time, the line ran between the I-395 viaduct and a large group of parking lots. Construction began on a new stadium for the Baltimore Ravens adjacent to the light rail line in 1996, and an infill station was added. The cost of constructing the stop was approximately $6 million - 12 times the average amount of a light rail stop - part because of a pedestrian bridge that had to be constructed to allow access to the stadium. The state contributed $5 million, with the remaining $1 million from the Ravens.

Initially, much of the light rail line outside of downtown had only one track, which forced trains to run on a tight schedule. The station opened for the first Ravens Stadium game on September 6, 1998, but it was only open for Ravens games to avoid upsetting the carefully balanced schedules. After the completion of double-tracking work on the southern half of the line, Hamburg Street station was opened for full-time service on July 1, 2005.

References

External links

Station from Hamburg Street from Google Maps Street View

Baltimore Light Rail stations
Railway stations in the United States opened in 1998
1998 establishments in Maryland
Railway stations in Baltimore